Church of Christ may refer to:

Church groups
 When used in the plural, a New Testament designation for local groups of people following the teachings of Jesus Christ: "...all the churches of Christ greet you", Romans 16:16.
 The entire body of Christians throughout the world, regardless of denomination or tradition, i.e. the Christian Church.
 Restoration movement churches such as the Churches of Christ (See below).
 Other non-restoration movement churches such as Churches of Christ in Europe often with congregational based governance structures (see below).
 Latter Day Saints churches (See below).

Churches influenced by the Stone-Campbell Restoration Movement
 Restoration Movement groups originating in Scotland and the United States
Mainstream Churches of Christ, not to be confused with Latter Day Saints who are commonly referred to as "The church of Jesus Christ"
The Churches of Christ (non-institutional), an identifiable subgroup within the Churches of Christ which opposes congregational support of institutions (such as orphans homes, Bible colleges, etc. on the basis of lack of adequate biblical support for doing so).
Christian churches and churches of Christ
Christian Church (Disciples of Christ)
Non-US groups
Churches of Christ in Australia
Evangelical Christian Church in Canada
Churches of Christ in Europe
Other historically related groups
Christian Connection
Christadelphians
Churches of Christ in Christian Union

Latter-day Saint denominations
Church of Christ (Latter-day Saints) – the original church founded by Joseph Smith, Jr. on April 6, 1830.
Pure Church of Christ – First schismatic sect in the Latter Day Saint movement, this denomination was organized in 1831 in Kirtland, Ohio, by Wycam Clark and Northrop Sweet and is now extinct.
Church of Christ (Ezra Booth) –  An extinct schismatic sect organized in 1836 by Ezra Booth in Kirtland, Ohio.
Church of Christ (Parrishite), an extinct Latter Day Saint denomination organized in 1837 by Warren Parrish in Kirtland, Ohio.
Church of Christ (William Chubby), an extinct Latter Day Saint denomination organized in the Late 1830s by William Chubby.
Church of Christ (Hiram Page), an extinct Latter Day Saint denomination organized in 1842 by Hiram Page, one of the Eight Witnesses to the Book of Mormon's golden plates.
Church of Christ (Wightite) – This denomination, founded by Lyman Wight in 1844, split from the Church of Christ (Latter Day Saints) at the death of Joseph Smith.
Church of Christ (Temple Lot) – Informally referred to as "Hedrickites", this denomination is headquartered in Independence, Missouri, on what is known as the Temple Lot. It was founded by Granville Hedrick in July 1863.
Church of Christ (Fettingite) – Informally referred to as the "Fettingites", after its founder Otto Fetting, this denomination is split from the Church of Christ (Temple Lot) in 1929.
Church of Christ with the Elijah Message, which broke away from the Temple Lot church in 1929.
Church of Christ (Restored) – This denomination split from the Church of Christ (Fettingite) in the late 1930s under the leadership of A. C. DeWolf.
Church of Christ at Halley's Bluff, which broke away from the Temple Lot church in 1932.
Church of Christ (Hancock) – Founded by Pauline Hancock, this denomination is split from the Church of Christ (Temple Lot) in 1946.
Church of Christ (Whitmerite) – A denomination, founded in 1847 and reformed 1871, based on the claims of David Whitmer, one of the Three Witnesses to the Book of Mormon.
Church of Christ (Brewsterite) – A denomination founded in 1848 by James C. Brewster and Hazen Aldrich.
Latter Day Church of Christ, a Mormon fundamentalist denomination based in Utah
Church of Christ (David Clark) – Also known as "Lion of God Ministry". Clark broke from the Reorganized Church of Jesus Christ of Latter Day Saints in November 1985.
Church of Christ (Leighton-Floyd/Burt) - This denomination, founded by Howard Leighton-Floyd and H. H. Burt in 1965, split from the Church of Christ with the Elijah Message.

Others
Churches of Christ in Europe, autonomous congregations using the name "church of Christ" that have no historical connection to the Restoration Movement
Church of Christ, Instrumental, also known as the Kelleyites, a Baptist denomination in Arkansas
Church of Christ, Scientist, also known as Christian Science

Country-specific churches known as Church of Christ  
Church of Christ in Congo, the administrative and spiritual union of denominations in the Democratic Republic of the Congo
Church of Christ in Thailand, the largest Protestant Church in Thailand.
Iglesia ni Cristo (Filipino translation for "Church of Christ"), an independent church originating in the Philippines
United Church of Christ in the Philippines, the largest Protestant group in the Philippines
United Church of Christ – Congregational in the Marshall Islands, the largest religious group in the Marshall Islands
United Church of Christ, a mainline Protestant denomination in the United States amalgamated from four congregationalist groups in 1957 (see also Christian Connection)

Individual church buildings or congregations

In Denmark:
 Church of Christ, a church in the Vesterbro district of Copenhagen

In the United States:
Church of Christ (Guy, Arkansas), listed on the NRHP in Arkansas and associated with the Churches of Christ.
Church of Christ (Perry, Illinois), listed on the NRHP in Illinois
Church of Christ (Revere, Massachusetts), listed on the NRHP in Massachusetts
Church of Christ, Swansea, Massachusetts, listed on the NRHP in Massachusetts
Church of Christ in LaRoche Township, Academy, South Dakota, listed on the NRHP in South Dakota.

See also
Church of Jesus Christ (disambiguation)
First Church of Christ (disambiguation)
Churches of God General Conference (Winebrenner)

Christian terminology